The 2012–13 season was Oldham Athletic's 16th consecutive season in the third division of the English football league system. It was Paul Dickov's third season as manager of the club. Oldham began inconsistently in the league before a poor run of form before Christmas 2012 led to Dickov's coaching team being placed on gardening leave. Victories over Nottingham Forest and Liverpool in the FA Cup followed but after a run of one point from nine games, Dickov resigned as manager on 3 February 2013.

Tony Philliskirk took over as caretaker manager and Matt Smith's last minute equaliser earned Philliskirk's men an FA Cup fifth round replay against Everton which Everton ultimately won 3–1. It was the furthest that the Latics had progressed in the FA Cup since reaching the semi-final in 1994.

Lee Johnson was appointed as Oldham's new manager on 18 March 2013, becoming the youngest manager in the Football League at only 31 years of age. Johnson led Oldham to safety with two games to spare with four wins, three draws and three defeats from the last ten games. Oldham finished the season in 19th position and with many of his first team squad out of contract, Johnson faced a summer of rebuilding in preparation for the 2013-14 season.

Squad & Coaching Staff

First Team Squad
Includes all players who were awarded a squad number during the season. Last updated on 7 July 2013
*Total appearances and goals as at the end of the 2012-13 season

Management & Coaching Staff

League table

Squad statistics

Appearances

Top scorers

Transfers

Results and fixtures

Pre-season friendlies

League One

FA Cup

League Cup

Football League Trophy

References 

Oldham Athletic A.F.C. seasons
Oldham Athletic